George Augustus Hunter Vanderspar (22 October 1858 – 23 May 1940) was an English cricketer. Born at Galle in British Ceylon, Vanderspar was a right-handed batsman and a right-arm fast-medium underarm bowler.

He made one appearance in first-class cricket for the Marylebone Cricket Club (MCC) against Kent in 1893 at Lord's. He batted once in the match, scoring 7 runs in the MCC's first-innings, before he was dismissed by Alec Hearne. The match ended in a victory for the MCC by an innings and 21 runs.

He died at Bournemouth, Hampshire on 23 May 1940.

References

External links
George Vanderspar at ESPNcricinfo
George Vanderspar at CricketArchive

1858 births
1940 deaths
Sportspeople from Galle
English cricketers
Marylebone Cricket Club cricketers
People from British Ceylon